ACM Transactions on Computational Logic (ACM TOCL) is a scientific journal that aims to disseminate the latest findings of note in the field of logic in computer science. It is published by the Association for Computing Machinery, a premier scientific and educational society on computer science and computational technology in the United States.

The editor-in-chief is Anuj Dawar (University of Cambridge). According to the Journal Citation Reports, the journal had a 2020 impact factor of 0.625.

See also
ACM SIGLOG, ACM's Special Interest Group on Computational Logic

References

External links

Transactions on Computational Logic
Computer science journals
Logic in computer science